Sarsa may refer to:

Places
 Sarsa, Anand, a village in the Anand District of the Indian state of Gujarat
 Sarsa, Bhiwani, a village in the Bhiwani district of the Indian state of Haryana
 Sarsa, Kheda, a village in the Kheda district of the Indian state of Gujarat
 Sarsa, Bharuch, a village in the Bharuch district of the Indian state of Gujarat
 Sarsa, Kurukshetra, a village in the kurukshetra district of the Indian state of haryana
Food
 Sarsa, the Philippine Spanish term for sawsawan dipping sauces in Filipino cuisine
Sarsa na uyang, a Philippine dish made with freshwater shrimp, coconut, and chilis

Others
 SARSA, State-Action-Reward-State-Action, a Markov decision process policy, used in the reinforcement learning area of machine learning
 Sarsa (singer), a Polish singer